Andrew B. Livingstone (born 1893; date of death unknown) was a Scottish footballer who played one game as a forward for Port Vale in March 1921.

Career
Livingstone played for Strathclyde, Kilmarnock, Queen's Park, Albion Rovers, Rangers, Stevenston United, Dumbarton Harp, Vale of Leven, and Bathgate. He then joined Port Vale in March 1921. His only Second Division appearance came in a 2–1 win over Cardiff City at Ninian Park on 26 March. He was released from The Old Recreation Ground at the end of the 1920–21 season. He later returned to Vale of Leven.

Career statistics
Source:

References

1893 births
Year of death missing
Footballers from Glasgow
Scottish footballers
Association football forwards
Strathclyde F.C. players
Rangers F.C. players
Dumbarton Harp F.C. players
Queen's Park F.C. players
Kilmarnock F.C. players
Albion Rovers F.C. players
Vale of Leven F.C. players
Bathgate F.C. players
Port Vale F.C. players
Scottish Junior Football Association players
Scottish Football League players
English Football League players